Qamar Ali Akhoon is an Indian politician from Jammu and Kashmir. He is a senior member of the Jammu and Kashmir National Conference.

In 1996, he was elected from Kargil district's Kargil assembly constituency of J & K.

Qamar Ali Akhoon was born in a religious family 'Akhoonpa' in village tSangrah which is about 48 km from Kargil town on 15 August 1957. He received his primary education from tSangrah and did his matriculation from Sankoo High School in the year 1973. He lost his parents when he was in Primary School, thereafter his elder brother Talib Hussain took the responsibility on his shoulders to support his family and to educate Qamar Ali and his younger brother Dr. Mohammad Jaffar.
A renowned religious scholar of Suru Valley Late Agha Syed Haider Rizvi assisted in sending him to Srinagar for Higher studies, after completing his graduation Qamar Ali Akhoon pursued LLB (Honors) instead of applying for a job. Later he joined politics. He is one of the most senior JKNC leader from the district.

On 11 June 2014 he was appointed as the Advisor to the Chief Minister J&K, in the capacity of a Cabinet Minister and a sitting Legislature representing 49-Kargil Constituency.
He was also the first Chief Executive Councillor / Chairman of the newly formed Ladakh Autonomous Hill Development Council Kargil in 2002. Earlier he has served as the Minister for Consumer Affairs & Public Distribution and Transport under Mr Omar Abdullah and Minister of State for Works and Power during the Farooq Abdullah regime, and he was the first Chief Executive Councillor of Ladakh Autonomous Hill Development Council Kargil as well.

References

1957 births
Living people
People from Kargil district
Jammu & Kashmir National Conference politicians
Jammu and Kashmir MLAs 1987–1996
Jammu and Kashmir MLAs 1996–2002
Jammu and Kashmir MLAs 2008–2014
Ladakh politicians